The 1925 Bradley Indians football team was an American football team that represented Bradley Polytechnic Institute—now  known as Bradley University—during the 1925 college football season as a member of the Illinois Intercollegiate Athletic Conference (IIAC). Bradley outscored its opponents 217 to 30 on the season.

Key players included right halfback Eddie "Red" Bland of Taylorville, Indiana. Halfback "Doc" Ranes was the team captain. Three Bradley players were selected as first-team players on the 1925 All-IIAC football team: Carlson at left end; Eugene McNaught at right guard; and Al DeCremer at left halfback.

Schedule

References

Bradley
Bradley Braves football seasons
Interstate Intercollegiate Athletic Conference football champion seasons
College football undefeated seasons
Bradley Indians football